Monein is a commune in the Pyrénées-Atlantiques department in south-western France.

Geography

Neighbouring Communes
North: Lahourcade and Pardies
West: Lucq-de-Béarn and Cardesse
South: Estialescq and Lasseube
East: Aubertin, Lacommande, Arbus, Cuqueron and Parbayse

Administration
List of mayors of Monein

Population

Notable people
 Jean Sarrailh
 Jean-Patrick Lescarboura
 Marie Bartête (1863-1938), French prisoner

Gallery

See also
Communes of the Pyrénées-Atlantiques department

References

External links

Official site of Monein

Communes of Pyrénées-Atlantiques